The Museum of Agriculture is a museum in Seoul, South Korea. The museum is built on land once owned by Jong-suh Kim who was the Deputy Prime Minister during the Chosun Dynasty. When Kim owned the land, he would rent out horses for travel. The museum has over 2,400 items regarding Korean agriculture.

See also
List of museums in South Korea

References 

Museums in Seoul
Agriculture museums in South Korea
Museums established in 1987